The 2020 Women's European Olympic Qualification Tournament was a volleyball tournament for women's national teams held in Apeldoorn, Netherlands from 7 to 12 January 2020. 8 teams played in the tournament and the winners Turkey qualified to the 2020 Women's Olympic Volleyball Tournament.

Pools composition
The hosts Netherlands and the top seven ranked teams from the CEV National Team Ranking as of 9 September 2019 which had not yet qualified to the 2020 Olympic Games competed in this tournament. Teams were seeded following the Serpentine system. Rankings are shown in brackets.

Squads

Venue

Pool standing procedure
 Number of matches won
 Match points
 Sets ratio
 Points ratio
 Result of the last match between the tied teams

Match won 3–0 or 3–1: 3 match points for the winner, 0 match points for the loser
Match won 3–2: 2 match points for the winner, 1 match point for the loser

Preliminary round
All times are Central European Time (UTC+01:00).

Pool A

 

|}

|}

Pool B

|}

|}

Final round
All times are Central European Time (UTC+01:00).

Semifinals

|}

Final

|}

Final standing

{| class="wikitable" style="text-align:center;"
|-
!width=40|Rank
!width=180|Team
|- bgcolor=#ccffcc
|1
|style="text-align:left;"|
|-
|2
|style="text-align:left;"|
|-
|3
|style="text-align:left;"|
|-
|4
|style="text-align:left;"|
|-
|5
|style="text-align:left;"|
|-
|6
|style="text-align:left;"|
|-
|7
|style="text-align:left;"|
|-
|8
|style="text-align:left;"|
|}

Individual awards

Most Valuable Player 
  Meryem Boz
Best Setter
  Joanna Wołosz
Best Outside Spikers
  Hanna Orthmann
  Magdalena Stysiak

Best Middle Blockers
  Eda Erdem Dündar
  Robin de Kruijf
Best Opposite Spiker
  Louisa Lippmann
Best Libero
  Simge Şebnem Aköz

See also
Volleyball at the 2020 Summer Olympics – Men's European qualification

References

External links

2020 in volleyball
2020 in Dutch sport
Volleyball qualification for the 2020 Summer Olympics
International volleyball competitions hosted by the Netherlands
January 2020 sports events in Europe